Windus is last name of English origin. It is a variant of the last name Wingers. The name is a metonymic occupational name for a textile worker or weaver, derived from the Middle English wyndhows ("winding house").

People with the last name Windus
 Claron A. Windus (1850–1927), United States Army officer
Theresa Windus, American chemist
 William Edward Windus, British poet and the Windus of Chatto and Windus
 William Lindsay Windus (1822–1907), British artist

Notes

References
 Surname DB entry